Acey is both a surname and a given name. Notable people with the name include:

 Taalam Acey (born 1970), American poet
 Acey Slade (born 1974), American guitarist

References 

Feminine given names
Masculine given names